Rohanlal Chaturvedi (born 7 July 1919, date of death unknown) was an Indian politician who was a member of 5th Lok Sabha from Etah (Lok Sabha constituency) in Uttar Pradesh State, India. He was born in Lakhimpur Kheri.

Chaturvedi was elected to 1st and 4th from Etah and 2nd Lok Sabha from Etawah (Lok Sabha constituency). 

Barhan Jn to Etah railway line was sanctioned and got operational during his tenure as Minister of state (Railways).

Chaturvedi died prior to 2012.

References

1919 births
Year of death missing
People from Etah district
India MPs 1962–1967
India MPs 1967–1970
India MPs 1971–1977
India MPs 1952–1957
Lok Sabha members from Uttar Pradesh
People from Etawah district
People from Lakhimpur Kheri
India MPs 1957–1962
Indian National Congress politicians from Uttar Pradesh